"Love Is Free" is a song written and recorded by American singer-songwriter Sheryl Crow. It was released as the second single from Crow's sixth studio album Detours. Its predecessor sing, "Shine over Babylon", was for airplay only.

On her website, Crow states that she was inspired by the floods in New Orleans. "What struck me about it is the stoicism of the New Orleans people, they are very spiritually based. You can see it in their eyes that they aren't going to give up, they are going to rebuild."

Music video
The music video shows Crow singing with an acoustic guitar in a boat while coming across all kinds of characters. It was directed by The Malloys.

The video for "Love Is Free" was added to the popular video-sharing site YouTube on 17 January 2008 and has had over 1,000,000 views.

Track listing

Maxi CD
"Love Is Free" (Album Version) - 3:23
"Drunk With the Thought of You" (Live Acoustic Version) - 2:46
"Shine Over Babylon" (Live Acoustic Version) - 4:01
"Love Is Free" (Enhanced Music Video)

Chart performance

Year-end charts

References

2008 singles
Sheryl Crow songs
A&M Records singles
Songs written by Sheryl Crow
Song recordings produced by Bill Bottrell
Music videos directed by The Malloys
2008 songs
Songs written by Bill Bottrell